Jirel of Joiry is a fictional character created by American  writer C. L. Moore, who appeared in a series of sword and sorcery stories published first in the pulp horror/fantasy magazine Weird Tales. Jirel is the proud, tough, arrogant and beautiful ruler of her own domain — apparently somewhere in medieval France. Her adventures continually involve her in dangerous brushes with the supernatural.

These stories are among the first to show the influence of Robert E. Howard on sword and sorcery; they also introduced a female protagonist to the genre.

Stories and collections 
Moore's Jirel stories include the following:

 "Black God's Kiss" (October 1934)
 "Black God's Shadow" (December 1934)
 "Jirel Meets Magic" (July 1935)
 "The Dark Land" (January 1936)
 "Quest of the Starstone" (November 1937), with Henry Kuttner
 "Hellsgarde" (April 1939)

These stories, except for "Quest of the Starstone", appear in the collection Jirel of Joiry (1969), and in the Gollancz Fantasy Masterworks compendium Black Gods and Scarlet Dreams (2002). All six appear in a collected edition under Paizo Publishing's "Planet Stories" imprint, compiled under the title Black God's Kiss.

Reception 
She has been described as one of the first strong female characters in the fantasy genre, and "the world's first female sword-and-sorcery hero".

Despite being a female character, her masculine traits have led to her being analyzed in the context of gender bending fiction.

In popular culture
"Jirel of Joiry", a 1985 filk song by Mercedes Lackey and Leslie Fish, appears on the album Murder, Mystery and Mayhem.

Bibliography 
 
 
 
 collects all of the Jirel and (primary) Northwest Smith stories except "Quest of the Starstone"
 
 "Where No Man Had Gone Before"; introduction by Suzy McKee Charnas
 "Black God's Kiss"
 "Black God's Shadow"
 "Jirel Meets Magic"
 "The Dark Land"
 "Hellsgarde"
 "Quest of the Starstone", with Henry Kuttner; Northwest Smith crossover story

References

External links 
 

Characters in fantasy literature
Characters in pulp fiction
Fantasy short stories
Female characters in literature
Fictional swordfighters
Fictional women soldiers and warriors
Literary characters introduced in 1934
Sword and sorcery